Piątnica Poduchowna (until 1999 Piątnica Poduchowna) is a village in Łomża County, Podlaskie Voivodeship, in north-eastern Poland. It is the seat of gmina (administrative district) called Gmina Piątnica.

In 2006 the village had a population of 1,800.

History
Piątnica was founded by Janusz from Zaborowo who built the first church there (1407). The village has also a Neo-Gothic church (1931), which was destroyed during the Second World War and reconstructed after that. There are also Russian forts from the 19th century and from the First World War in its vicinity. During World War II, the forts played a crucial role during the Battle of Łomża.

References

Villages in Łomża County
Łomża Governorate
Białystok Voivodeship (1919–1939)
Warsaw Voivodeship (1919–1939)
Belastok Region